Vilfor Hysa (born 9 September 1989) is an Albanian professional footballer who plays as a forward for KF Lushnja.

Club career
Hysa joined Vllaznia Shkodër on 24 July 2012 by signing a one-year contract for an undisclosed fee.

He was loaned out to Flamurtari Vlorë on a 6-month deal, which ended in January 2012. He returned to his parent club Laçi on 27 January. Following his return, Hysa accused Flamurtari Vlorë boss Shkëlqim Muça as the main reason of his departure from the team.

In summer 2013 Hysa signed a one-year contract with the Kukësi with an option to expand it for a further year. He announced his departure on 10 August 2015 following the expiration of his contract with the club.

On 1 September 2015, Hysa returned to Kastrioti Krujë, this time in Albanian First Division, by signing a one-year deal.

On 22 July 2018, Hysa moved to Kosovo where he signed with top flight side Gjilani.

International career
Internationally he has represented his country at U17, U19, U20 and U21 level but has yet to feature for the senior national side.

Career statistics

Honours
Kamza
Albanian First Division: 2016–17

References

External links

1989 births
Living people
Footballers from Tirana
Albanian footballers
Association football forwards
Albania under-21 international footballers
Albania youth international footballers
KF Tirana players
KF Teuta Durrës players
KF Laçi players
Flamurtari Vlorë players
KF Vllaznia Shkodër players
KS Kastrioti players
FK Kukësi players
FC Kamza players
Lija Athletic F.C. players
F.C. Grosseto S.S.D. players
SC Gjilani players
KF Drenica players
FK Dinamo Tirana players
KS Lushnja players
Kategoria Superiore players
Kategoria e Parë players
Maltese Premier League players
Football Superleague of Kosovo players
Albanian expatriate footballers
Expatriate footballers in Malta
Albanian expatriate sportspeople in Malta
Expatriate footballers in Italy
Albanian expatriate sportspeople in Italy
Expatriate footballers in Kosovo
Albanian expatriate sportspeople in Kosovo